Al-Madinah College of Technology is a governmental technical college located in Madina, Saudi Arabia, was established in 1998. The college focuses on technical and vocational training to prepare students for careers. It is one of the technical colleges that are governed by the Technical and Vocational Training Corporation (TVTC), the government provider of training in the kingdom.

Programs 
This college offers a variety of degree programs including electrical technology, mechanical technology, computer technology and electronic technology.

See also 

 Technical and Vocational Training Corporation
 List of technical colleges in Saudi Arabia

References 

Vocational education in Saudi Arabia
Technical universities and colleges in Saudi Arabia
Education in Jeddah
1998 establishments in Saudi Arabia